The Slade Box (A 4CD Anthology 1969-1991) is a four disc box set by the British rock band Slade. It was released by Salvo on 2 October 2006.

The Slade Box contains eighty-four tracks ranging across the band's career from 1969 to 1991. A 72-page booklet was included with liner notes by Keith Altham. In 2011, the box set was re-issued by Salvo. It featured the same track listing but was packaged in a shortened case with the booklet reduced to 36-pages.

Track listing

Disc one

Disc two

Disc three

Disc four

Critical reception

Upon release, Dave Thompson of AllMusic commented: 

Gary Crowley of BBC Radio London said: "This splendidly put together 4-CD set is a timely reminder of their might and talent, which went far beyond the numerous foot-stompin', badly-spelt hits they racked up in the singles charts over the years." Gavin Martin of Daily Mirror wrote: "This collection - complete with an excellent essay charting their career - is an essential fan's portrait of a working band in their prime." Peter Makowski of Classic Rock commented: "This four-CD compilation presents a comprehensive history of our dyslexic gurners, from their early skinhead days as an underwhelming rock band to the golden years and a non-stop barrage of stomping hits." Alan Jones from Music Week said: "Appearing hot on the heels of individually upgraded and remastered editions of Slade's albums, this four CD boxed set is a superb alternative, collecting together 84 hits, album cuts and rarities from 1969 to 1991 in a sturdy cardboard longbox, which also includes a 72-page booklet containing an informative essay on the band by Keith Altham, an extensive discography and a multitude of pictures of the band."

Personnel
Slade
Noddy Holder – lead vocals, guitar
Dave Hill – lead guitar, backing vocals
Jim Lea – bass, piano, violin, keyboards, guitar, backing vocals
Don Powell – drums

The Slade Box personnel
Slade, Colin Newman - project management
Mark Brennan - project consultant
Tim Turan - remastering
Keith Altham - liner notes
Andrew Birkin, Barry Plummer, Dezo Hoffmann, Gered Mankowitz - photography

References

2006 compilation albums
Slade compilation albums